Ducking The Devil is a 1957 Warner Bros. Merrie Melodies animated cartoon directed by Robert McKimson. The short was released on August 17, 1957, and stars Daffy Duck and the Tasmanian Devil.

Plot
At a zoo, a cage was reserved for the Tasmanian Devil. He soon escapes and runs amok, scaring away everyone from the zoo in the process. Meanwhile, Daffy is at home in his duck pond, and reads about Taz's escape in a newspaper. Taz soon finds him and gives chase after the black duck. While fleeing from Taz's hungry jaws, Daffy hears a news bulletin posting a $5,000 reward (the equivalent of $45,686.65 in 2022) for the Tasmanian Devil's return which also says Taz becomes docile when exposed to music.  

After failing with a radio (the extension cord doesn't go too far), a trombone (Daffy loses the slide) and bagpipes (apparently the only music Taz doesn't like), Daffy eventually resorts to using his own voice to calm the devil. After Taz grabs some of the Duck's reward money, which slipped on the ground, Daffy rushes inside the cage screaming his famous line: "It's mine! Mine, all mine!", and beats up Taz, and reassures the audience that he may be a coward, but he's a "greedy little coward".

Home media
"Ducking the Devil" is available on the Looney Tunes Superstars DVD. However, it was cropped to widescreen.  It was also included in Looney Tunes Platinum Collection Vol. 1, this time in the ratio in which it was originally animated (fullscreen aspect ratio). You can also find it on Taz's Jungle Jams VHS starring the little devil himself.

Notes
"Zookeeper Burton", mentioned by a radio announcer in a newsflash that Daffy is listening to, is possibly a reference to Warners production manager John Burton. (It is rather funny that, even at this late date, the aging remnants of the old Termite Terrace gang would still be referring to themselves and their studio as a "zoo".)

This is one of several WB cartoons that uses the gag of receiving a package immediately after placing the order in the mailbox.

This was the only Golden Age Warner Bros. cartoon where Taz's adversary was a character other than Bugs Bunny (in this case, Daffy Duck).

A small amount of footage from both Bedevilled Rabbit and Wild Over You is reused in this cartoon.

A running gag is that Taz acts the character about whom the music plays; for example, he mimics a stage Irishman with pipe when Daffy sings When Irish Eyes Are Smiling.

This is also one of the few times Daffy goes after a large sum of money and not only succeeds in getting it, but keeps it by the cartoon's end.

Among the headlines in the newspaper Daffy reads, in the beginning, include "Ike to Make Slow Cruise to Bermuda" and "3700 May Quit Tonight".

Music
 Carolina in the Morning by Gus Kahn
 When Irish Eyes are Smiling by Ernest Ball
 Moonlight Bay by Edward Madden
 The Gold Diggers' Song (We're in the Money) by Harry Warren
 L%27amour toujours by Catherine Chisholm Cushing
 Sweet Georgia Brown by Ben Bernie and Maceo Pinkard
 I'm Looking Over a Four Leaf Clover by Mort Dixon and Harry M. Woods
 It's Magic by Jule Styne

References

External links

 

1957 films
1957 animated films
1957 short films
Merrie Melodies short films
Films directed by Robert McKimson
Daffy Duck films
Films scored by Milt Franklyn
Tasmanian Devil (Looney Tunes) films
1950s Warner Bros. animated short films
Films produced by Edward Selzer
1950s English-language films
Films set in zoos